Khe Sanh can refer to several topics:

Places
 Khe Sanh, district capital of Hướng Hoá District, Quảng Trị Province, Vietnam
 Khe Sanh Combat Base, was a United States Marine Corps outpost south of the Vietnamese Demilitarized Zone (DMZ) used during the Vietnam War

Other uses
 "Khe Sanh" (song), a song by Cold Chisel
 Battle of Khe Sanh, a 1968 battle during the Vietnam War

See also
 Kaesong, a city in North Korea
 Kajang, a city in Malaysia
 Que Son Valley, a valley in Quảng Nam Province